Melanie Neef (born 26 May 1970) is a British former track and field sprinter who specialised in the 400 metres. She represented her country at the 1995 World Championships in Athletics and 1995 IAAF World Indoor Championships. She set her lifetime best of 51.18 seconds at the outdoor event.

Born in Scotland to German footballer Gerhardt Neef, who was playing for Rangers F.C., she became involved in athletics with the City of Glasgow club. Her first international medal came at the 1991 Summer Universiade where she was runner-up with the British women's 4 × 100 metres relay team. She won senior gold medals with the 4 × 400 metres relay team at the 1994 European Cup and 1994 IAAF World Cup, as well as a fourth place at the 1994 European Athletics Championships.

Neef took an individual silver medal at the 1994 European Cup behind Russia's Svetlana Goncharenko and returned the following year to win gold. She was a finalist individually at the 1994 European Championships and came sixth for Scotland at the 1994 Commonwealth Games. Her last individual international outing was at the 1995 World Championships in Athletics, where she was fourth in her semi-final.

She was a four-time national champion during her brief career, taking 400 m title outdoors at the AAA Championships in 1994 and 1995, and the national indoor title at the AAA Indoor Championships in 1995 and 1996.

International competitions

National titles
AAA Championships
400 m: 1994, 1995
AAA Indoor Championships
400 m: 1995, 1996

References

External links

Living people
1970 births
British female sprinters
Scottish female sprinters
World Athletics Championships athletes for Great Britain
Commonwealth Games competitors for Scotland
Athletes (track and field) at the 1994 Commonwealth Games
Scottish people of German descent
Universiade medalists in athletics (track and field)
Universiade silver medalists for Great Britain
Medalists at the 1991 Summer Universiade